The mineral mining industry is a crucial piece of the Economy of Niger.  Exports of minerals consistently account for 40% of exports.

Mineral commodities produced in Niger included cement, coal, gold, gypsum, limestone, salt, silver, tin, and uranium. In 2006, Niger was the world’s fourth-ranked producer of uranium. A new mining code was adopted in August 2006 and the former National Mine research Office (ONAREM), whose responsibilities included organizing mining exploration programs, was replaced by two newly established entities: the geological and Mining Research Center and the Mining Company of Niger (SOPaMin). SOPaMin is to hold the state’s shares in the existing uranium companies and is in charge of engaging in commercial transactions, such as uranium sales. Since the adoption of the new Mining Code, the government has issued a significant number of new mineral exploration permits. Niger joined the Extractive Industry Transparency Initiative (EITI) in 2005 and, as part of the EITI efforts, appointed in late 2006 a national consultative committee, which included representatives of the general public. A first audit report reconciling revenue paid by mining companies with government receipts was scheduled to be issued in late 2007.

Minerals in the National Economy

Niger’s mineral sector accounted for about 3% of the GDP and for about 40% of exports. according to the International Monetary Fund (IMF), a renewed interest in the generation of nuclear energy had led to increased demand for uranium, encouraged investment expansions at existing uranium mines, and promoted exploration. Foreign direct investment in the sector by renowned French company AREVA from 2008 to 2012 was projected to be $1.4 billion, which would double the country’s uranium production capacity

Uranium

SOMAIR is owned by Areva at 63.4% and the government of Niger at 36.6% and employed about 600 people.
In 1978, the second uranium mining project began production in Akokan near Arlit and operated by COMINAK, a national company, like SOMAIR with Areva and the government of Niger as shareholders. COMINAK is owned by Areva NC at 34%, the government of Niger at 31%, Overseas uranium resources development Company of Japan at 25%, and Enusa industrias avanzadas, S.a. of Spain at 10% and employed about 1,100 people. The underground mine of Akokan is the largest underground uranium mine in the world. The mining activities created an economic boom in the country, as Nigerien budgets flourished in the 1970s due to record uranium prices.  Extracted uranium from SOMAIR and COMINAK was initially sold entirely by French concessionary corporations, with contracts later revised to give Niger both an overall contract payment, rent, and a smaller amount of ore it could sell on world markets.

The stakeholders in SOMINA are:  China National Nuclear Corporation at 37.2%, the government of Niger through the national mining company (SOPAMIN) at 33%, ZXJOY, a Chinese, at 24.8% and KORES, a Korean national company, at 5%.
The production of uranium has drastically increased in recent years passing from 2993 tonnes in 2008 to 4821 tonnes in 2012. Uranium ore mined in the Arlit area (Agadez Region) is extracted as Triuranium octoxide. 
SOMAIR mine has uranium reserve of 14,000 tonnes (with U3O8 @ 0.3%) as of 2011 and a production capacity of 2,700 tonnes per year. The COMINAK concession totaled 29,000 tonnes (U3O8 @ 0.4%) and has a production capacity of 1,500 tonnes per year. The Azelik mine operated by SOMINA has a production rate of 700 tonnes per year in 2011, and is expected to increase to 2500 tonnes per year by 2015.

The Imouraren mine, presently under construction, is expected to have the largest uranium reserves in Niger (120,000 tonnes) albeit at a lower concentration of uranium (U3O8 @ 0.15%).

Coal 

The history of coal exploration and mining dates back to 1968 when coal reserves were discovered in Anou Araren by an exploration team led by the French Atomic Commission Commissariat à l’énergie atomique. This discovery and the parallel discovery and exploitation of uranium mines in the same region of Niger lead to the creation of SONICHAR in 1975. The goal was to mine coal which will be used as a fuel to power the thermal power plants in order to supply power to uranium mining activities in Arlit. In 1980, coal mining began at Anou Araren and a year later, the thermal power plant was in operation. Since then, coal mining projects have stagnated. In 2008, coal reserves . In 2014, construction for the second coal mine began in Salkadamna in Takanamatt, Tahoua Region. The coal extracted from the mine will supply a 600 MW power plant and coal briquette plant adjacent to the mine.
The Anou Araren coal reserves are estimated at 15 million tonnes and in 2011, 246,016 tonnes of coal were extracted from the mine. The coal reserves at Salkadamna are estimated at 70 million tonnes.

Gold 

Exploitable deposits of gold have long been known to exist in south western region of Niger and more recently in northern region of Agadez. Artisanal gold mining was already conducted between the Niger River and the border with Burkina Faso. 
In 2004, the Samira Hill Gold Mine, operated by Mining company of Liptako, began production. The mining company of Liptako owned by two Canadian companies at 40% each and the government of Niger at 20%. The gold production in 2011 is 1,564 kg from this mine and has decreased steadily since 2008. In 2014, two gold deposits have been found in the Agadez Region in Djado and Mount Ibl, 700 and 360 km from Agadez city, respectively. The site in Djado was discovered in April 2014 and resulted in a gold rush that attracted local inhabitants of Agadez as well as prospectors from neighboring countries like Chad, Sudan and Burkina Faso. Activities at the Djado site were temporarily ceased in order to organize exploration and artisanal extraction activities, to improve infrastructures, principally water supply and to improve the security presence. The site near Mount Ibl was discovered in September 2014. Exploration permits are required for all prospectors prior to accessing the sites.

Cement 
The cement extraction industry exist in Niger since 1964 when the Malbaza cement plant was opened. Located in the Tahoua Region, the cement plant has been the only such project until 2014. In 2011, work for expanding the cement plant of Malbaza began with the expectation to increase its production capacity by 13 folds. In 2014, work began for a new cement plant in Keita in the Tahoua Region.
The Malbaza cement plant presently produces 40,000 tonnes per year and, upon expansion, is expected to reach 540,000 tonnes per year. The Keita cement under construction is expected to produce 1 million tonnes per year at startup and 1.5 million tonnes per year afterwards.

Labor issues
According to the U.S. Department of Labor, 47.8% of children aged 5 to 14 are working children and 4.3% of them are engaged in hazardous activities in the industrial sector, mining for trona, salt, gypsum and gold. The Department's 2014 List of Goods Produced by Child Labor or Forced Labor reported that Niger's mining industry still resorts to such practices in the production of these goods.

See also
Petroleum industry in Niger
Economy of Niger
List of countries by gold production
List of countries by uranium production
Uranium reserves (list by nation)

References

 U.S. geological Survey Minerals yearbook, volume iii, area reports—international— africa and the Middle east,.
 International Monetary Fund, 2007a, Fourth review under the three-year arrangement under the poverty reduction and growth facility and request for waiver and modification of performance criteria: Washington, dC, International Monetary Fund, July, 45 p.
 International Monetary Fund, 2007b, Letter of intent, memorandum of economic and financial policies of the government of Niger for 2007, and technical memorandum of understanding for 2007: Washington, dC, International Monetary Fund, 21 p.
 International Monetary Fund, 2007c, Letter of intent, memorandum of economic and financial policies, and technical memorandum of understanding: Washington, dC, International Monetary Fund, May 16, 23 p.
 Mining Journal, 2006, China in Niger: Mining Journal, July 21, p. 1.

External links
Niger country page at EITI international website

Mining in Niger
Economy of Niger